Francisco José Jattin Safar (died May 15, 2009) was a Colombian politician and diplomat. He was Senator of Colombia from 1994 to 1996, when he lost his seat in Congress for his connection to the proceso 8000. Jattin also served as Chamber Representative for Córdoba, where he was President of the Chamber for three terms.

References

Year of birth missing
2009 deaths
People from Córdoba Department
Colombian people of Lebanese descent
Ambassadors of Colombia to Panama
Members of the Chamber of Representatives of Colombia
Presidents of the Chamber of Representatives of Colombia
Members of the Senate of Colombia